Tribulatia is a genus of fungi in the family Phyllachoraceae. This is a monotypic genus, containing the single species Tribulatia appendicospora.

The genus name of Tribulatia is in honour of Louis Charles Trabut (1853–1929), who was a French botanist and physician. He is remembered for his work involving the flora of Algeria and Tunisia.

References

Phyllachorales
Monotypic Sordariomycetes genera